Agonops is a monotypic genus of beetles in the family Carabidae, with Agonops humerosus as its sole species. The name Agonops is a replacement name for Agonopsis , 1889, being a junior homonym of Agonopsis , 1861, a genus of fishes. Agonops humerosus is now often placed in the genus Agonum as Agonum humerosum, with Agonops placed in the synonymy of Agonum.

References

Platyninae